The Diocese of Alghero-Bosa is a Latin Catholic bishopric, suffragan of the Metropolitan Archdiocese of Sassari, on Sardinia, insular Italy.

The Diocese has an area of 2,012; a total population of 106,300; a Catholic population of 105,650; 87 priests, 7 permanent deacons and 176 religious.

The bishops' seat is Alghero Cathedral. Bosa Cathedral is a co-cathedral of the diocese.

History 
Alghero was built by the Doria of Genoa in 1102. In 1106 John, Bishop of Alghero, assisted at the consecration of the Church of the Trinity in Saccargia.

After a long period, the see was renewed and confirmed by Pope Julius II in his Papal Bull of 8 December 1503, splitting its territory off from the Metropolitan Archdiocese of Sassari, from the suppressed Roman Catholic Diocese of Bisarcio, Diocese of Castro and Diocese of Ottana. Pietro Parens, a Genoese, became bishop; he was present at the Fifth Lateran Council in 1512.

On 21 July 1779 it lost territory to establish the Diocese of Galtelli-Nuoro. In 1798 it gained territory from the Archdiocese of Sassari. On 9 March 1803 it gained territory from the Diocese of Bosa, and lost territory to establish the Diocese of Bisarcio. On 31 December 1938 it lost territory to the Diocese of Nuoro.

In 1986 the historic Diocese of Alghero was renamed as the Diocese of Alghero–Bosa preserving the title of the diocese of Bosa while absorbing its territory. Alghero Cathedral remains the seat of the diocese, while Bosa Cathedral is now a co-cathedral.

Other major churches in the diocese are the Basilica of Our Lady of the Snows (Santa Maria della Neve) at Cuglieri, and the Sanctuary of Our Lady of Valverde near Alghero.

On Monday, 31 January 2011, the Vatican Information Service (VIS) announced that Pope Benedict XVI had appointed the Reverend Father , S.D.B., Professor of Holy Scripture at the Pontifical Theological Faculty of Sardinia, as Bishop-elect of the Diocese of Alghero-Bosa, Italy. He was born in Arborea in 1958, and was ordained a priest in 1986.

Episcopal ordinaries
(all Roman Rite)

Suffragan Bishops of Alghero 
 Pedro Parente (18 December 1503 until his death in 1514)
 Juan Loaysa (13 November 1514 – 8 June 1524), later Bishop of Mondoñedo (Spain) (8 June 1524 until his death in 1525)
 Guillermo Casador (19 June 1525 until his death in 1527)
 Domenico Pastorello, Conventual Franciscans (O.F.M. Conv.) (1528 – 13 November 1534), later Metropolitan Archbishop of Cagliari (Sardinia, Italy) (13 November 1534 until his death in October 1547) and Bishop of Iglesias (Italy) (13 November 1534 until his death in October 1547)
 Juan Reina (3 November 1534 – 5 June 1538), later Bishop of Pamplona (Spain) (5 June 1538 until his death on 18 January 1539)
 Durante Duranti (25 June 1538 – 18 February 1541), later Bishop of Cassano all’Jonio (Italy) (18 February 1541 – 18 February 1551), created Cardinal-Priest of Ss. XII Apostoli (9 January 1545 until his death on 24 December 1557), Bishop of Brescia (Italy) (18 February 1551 until his death on 24 December 1557)
 Pedro Vaguer (4 May 1541 until his death in 1556)
 Pedro del Frago Garcés (20 December 1566 – 26 November 1572), previously Bishop of Ales (Italy) (6 November 1562 – 20 December 1566), Bishop of Terralba (Italy) (6 November 1562 – 20 December 1566); later Bishop of Jaca (Spain) (26 November 1572 – 11 September 1577), Bishop of Huesca (Spain) (11 September 1577 until his death on 2 February 1584)
 Antioco Nin (1572 until his death in 1578)
 Andrés Bacallar (13 January 1578 – 13 September 1604), later Metropolitan Archbishop of Sassari (Sardinia, Italy) (13 September 1604 until his death in November 1612)
 Nicolò Canavera (1605 until his death in 1611)
 Gavino Manca de Cedrelles (26 March 1612 – 29 July 1613); previously Bishop of Bosa (Italy) (27 June 1605 – 26 March 1612); later Metropolitan Archbishop of Sassari (Italy) (29 July 1613 until his death in July 1620)
 Lorenzo Nieto y Corrales Montero Nieto, Benedictine Order (O.S.B.) (12 August 1613 – 25 October 1621); previously Bishop of Ales (Italy) (17 April 1606 – 12 August 1613), Bishop of Terralba (Italy) (17 April 1606 – 12 August 1613); later Metropolitan Archbishop of Oristano (Italy) (25 October 1621 – 1625), Metropolitan Archbishop of Cagliari (Italy) (1625 until his death in 1626) and Bishop of Iglesias (Italy) (1625–1626)
 Ambrogio Machin, Mercederians (O. de M.) (1621 – 20 September 1627), previously General Master of the Order of the Blessed Virgin Mary of Mercy (Mercedarians) (1618 – 1621); later Metropolitan Archbishop of Cagliari (Italy) (20 September 1627 until his death on 23 October 1640) and Bishop of Iglesias (Italy) (20 September 1627 – 23 October 1640)
 Gaspar Prieto Orduña, O. de M. (6 October 1627 – 18 February 1636), later Bishop of Perpignan–Elne (France) (18 February 1636 until his death on 30 October 1637)
 Father Cipriano de Azcón (Azcon) (7 September 1637 until his death in 1639; never took possession)
 Antonio Nusco (Nuseo) (1639 until his death in 1642)
 Vicente Agustín Clavería (17 October 1644 until his death in 1652), previously Titular Bishop of Petra (28 July 1631 – 27 June 1639) & Auxiliary Bishop of Valencia (28 July 1631 – 27 June 1639), Bishop of Bosa (27 June 1639 – 17 October 1644)
 Francesco Boyl, O. de M. (1653 until his death in 1655)
 Dionigi Carta-Senes, Friars Minor (O.F.M.) (24 September 1657 until his death in 1658)
 Salvatore Mulas Pirella (9 June 1659 until his death in 1661)
 Andrés Aznar Naves, Augustinians (O.E.S.A.) (15 January 1663 – 16 Nov 1671), later Bishop of Jaca (Spain) (16 November 1671 – 16 April 1674), Bishop of Teruel (Spain) (16 April 1674 – 7 May 1682)
 Lussorio Roger (Rogger) (15 January 1672 until his death in 1676)
 Francisco López de Urraca, O.E.S.A. (13 September 1677 – 14 April 1681), previously Bishop of Bosa (Italy) (15 January 1672 – 13 September 1677); later Bishop of Barbastro (Spain) (14 April 1681 – 27 January 1695)
 Luis Diaz de Aux de Armendáriz, O. de M. (1 September 1681 – 18 March 1686), later Metropolitan Archbishop of Cagliari (Italy) (18 March 1686 until his death in 1689) and Bishop of Iglesias (Italy) (18 March 1686 until his death in 1689)
 Jerónimo Velasco, Benedictine Order (O.S.B.) (1 January 1686 until his death in 1692)
 Father José de Jesús María Fajardo, Discalced Augustinians (O.A.D.) (18 May 1693 until his death in 1693; never took possession)
 Tommaso Carnicer (Carnizar), Dominican Order (O.P.) (19 September 1695 until his death in 1720)
 Giovanni Battista Lomellini, O.P. (16 December 1726 – 17 August 1729), later Bishop of Saluzzo (Italy) (17 August 1729 until his death on 28 February 1733)
 Dionigi Gioacchino Belmont (5 September 1729 until his death in 1732)
 Matteo Bertolini (5 May 1733 – 27 November 1741), later Metropolitan Archbishop of Sassari (Italy) (27 November 1741 until his death on 9 November 1750)
 Carlo Francesco Casanova (27 November 1741 – 17 May 1751), later Metropolitan Archbishop of Sassari (Italy) (17 May 1751 until his death on 26 February 1763)
 Giuseppe Agostino Delbecchi, Piarists (Sch. P.) (17 May 1751 – 18 July 1763), later Metropolitan Archbishop of Cagliari (Italy) (18 July 1763 until his death on 1 April 1777)
 Giuseppe Maria Incisa Beccaria (9 July 1764 – 7 September 1772), later Metropolitan Archbishop of Sassari (Italy) (7 September 1772 until his death on 12 October 1782)
 Gioacchino Michele Radicati, O.P. (7 September 1772 until his death on 19 May 1793)
 Salvator Giuseppe Mammeli (confirmed 11 Aug 1800 – died 26 Feb 1801) 
 Pietro Bianco (confirmed 23 Sep 1805 – died 28 May 1827) 
 Filippo Arrica (confirmed 24 Feb 1832 – died 29 Jan 1839) 
 Efisio Casula (confirmed 22 Jul 1842 – ) 
 Pietro-Raffaele Arduini, O.F.M. Conv. (confirmed 30 Jan 1843 – died 12 Nov 1863) 
 Giovanni Maria Filia (appointed 24 Nov 1871 – died 22 Oct 1882) 
 Eliseo Giordano, O. Carm. (appointed 15 Mar 1883 – died 7 Jan 1906) 
 Giovanni Battista Vinati (appointed 16 Jan 1906 – resigned May 1907) 
 Ernesto Maria Piovella, Obl. Rho (appointed 15 Apr 1907 – 15 Apr 1914: appointed Archbishop of Oristano) 
 Francesco d’Errico (appointed 8 Sep 1914 – resigned 8 Oct 1938) 
 Adolfo Ciuchini, O. de M. (appointed 3 Mar 1939 – retired 7 Jan 1967) 
 Francesco Spanedda (appointed 18 Mar 1972 – 17 Mar 1979: appointed Archbishop of Oristano) 
 Giovanni Pes (appointed 23 May 1979 – retired 18 Feb 1993)

Suffragan Bishops of Alghero-Bosa

 Antonio Vacca (appointed 18 Feb 1993 – resigned 29 Sep 2006) 
 Giacomo Lanzetti (appointed 29 Sep 2006 – 28 Jun 2010: appointed Bishop of Alba (Pompea)) 
 Mauro Maria Morfino, S.D.B. (appointed 31 Jan 2011 – )

Notes

Sources and external links

 GCatholic with incumbent bio links

Alghero
Religious organizations established in the 1530s
Alghero
Alghero